Edson Henrique da Silva or simply Edson (born 6 July 1987) is a Brazilian footballer who played as a centre back. He has been hailed as one of the biggest talents that ever set foot on Koprivnica ground.

Career
Born in Itaquitinga-PE, he debuted as a senior by playing with Figueirense in the 2005 Campeonato Brasileiro Série A. He played with Figueirense until 2012. After playing with them in the Serie A until 2007, he moved on loan to Portugal to play with Belenenses in the second half of the 2007–08 Primeira Liga season. He stayed in Portugal for the next season, playing on loan with Primeira Liga sides Académica de Coimbra and Rio Ave. In summer 2009, he returned to Figueirense and played until the end of the year with them in the 2009 Campeonato Brasileiro Série B. In 2010, he was loaned to Serie A side Botafogo. In summer 2011, he was loaned again to a Portuguese club, this time to U.D. Leiria and played with them in the 2011–12 Primeira Liga. In summer 2012, he returned to Brazil and played with Figueirense in the 2012 Campeonato Brasileiro Série A. At the end of the year, he was released by Figueirense, and in summer 2013 he signed with Croatian Prva HNL side NK Slaven Belupo.

Edson joined CRB for the 2019 season.

Honours
Figueirense
Campeonato Catarinense: 2006

Botafogo
Campeonato Carioca: 2010

References

External links
Guardian Stats Centre
 sambafoot
 zerozero.pt
 figueirense.com

1987 births
Living people
Brazilian footballers
Brazil youth international footballers
Brazil under-20 international footballers
Brazilian expatriate footballers
Expatriate footballers in Portugal
Sociedade Esportiva e Recreativa Caxias do Sul players
Figueirense FC players
Botafogo de Futebol e Regatas players
U.D. Leiria players
NK Slaven Belupo players
Clube de Regatas Brasil players
Associação Académica de Coimbra – O.A.F. players
Rio Ave F.C. players
C.F. Os Belenenses players
Gostaresh Foulad F.C. players
Machine Sazi F.C. players
América Futebol Clube (RN) players
Campeonato Brasileiro Série A players
Primeira Liga players
Persian Gulf Pro League players
Croatian Football League players
Expatriate footballers in Croatia
Expatriate footballers in Iran
Brazilian expatriate sportspeople in Portugal
Brazilian expatriate sportspeople in Croatia
Brazilian expatriate sportspeople in Iran
Association football defenders
Sportspeople from Pernambuco